Giganteopalpus is a monotypic moth genus in the family Sphingidae first described by Adolph Huwe in 1895. Its only species, Giganteopalpus mirabilis, described by Walter Rothschild in 1895, is known from Sundaland.

It is very similar to Eurypteryx species, but differs in the enlarged labial palps, the second segment of which is broader than long, and the costal margin of the hindwing having a prominent antemedian lobe.

The larvae possibly feed on Araceae species. They are light green and marked only with a white subdorsal streak over the thoracic segments. The horn is very long, straight, colourless at the base, and green with black granules distally.

References

Macroglossini
Monotypic moth genera
Moths of Asia